Banisia  apicale is a species of moth of the family Thyrididae. It is found in the Seychelles on Silhouette Island.

References

Thyrididae
Moths described in 1912
Fauna of Seychelles